Kea Monastery was a monastery at Kea in Cornwall, UK, of which little is known. "The mysterious land-owning monastery of St Cheus mentioned in Domesday (in Powder), 1085, possibly refers to Kea."--Charles Henderson, in Cornish Church Guide, 1925, p. 116.

Old Kea Church and the nearby village of Kea are said to have been named after the Saint Kea who arrived at Old Kea from Ireland in the 5th century.

References

Monasteries in Cornwall